Washington Ridge is a rock ridge surmounted by three peaks, standing 1.5 miles (2.4 km) southeast of Mount Franklin in the south group of the Rockefeller Mountains on Edward VII Peninsula. Discovered on a Byrd Antarctic Expedition flight of January 27, 1929. Named by Admiral Richard Evelyn Byrd for his niece, Helen A. Washington.

Ridges of the Ross Dependency
King Edward VII Land